Anchovy and Salt Museum  is a museum in the town of L'Escala, Catalonia, Spain. It was opened in 2006 as an institution dedicated to displaying the cultural heritage of the village. The permanent exhibition shows the history of fishing from the 16th century to the present day, especially the salted anchovy, an industry which, over the centuries, has been driving force of the town and has made it famous around the world.

The museum also organises the Salt Festival, an event that takes place on the third Saturday in September each year.

See also 
 List of museums in Catalonia

References

External links 
 Official website

Museums in Girona
Industry museums in Catalonia